Emanuele Concetti (born 6 March 1978) is an Italian footballer goalkeeper.

Career
Concetti started his professional career at Lazio. In mid-2000, he was loaned to Arezzo. During the 2002–03 season, he was initially a backup for Angelo Peruzzi and Luca Marchegiani, although he played once for Lazio in the UEFA Cup, against FC Red Star Belgrade.

In June 2003, he joined Perugia but loaned to Catania at the start of season, as Lorenzo Squizzi's backup. In January 2005, he left for Lodigiani and in January 2006 for Sambenedettese, replacing Antonio Rosati and compete the first choice with Domenico Di Dio. In mid-2006, he joined Monza of Serie C1, as the first choice goalkeeper, ahead Fabio Carrara. In January 2007, he was loaned to Chievo, replacing Mattia Passarini, again as Lorenzo Squizzi's backup. In mid-2007, he joined Crotone which he won promotion to Serie B in 2009. He lost his starting place to Vid Belec during 2010–11 Serie B and was released by Crotone in June 2011, which Giacomo Bindi succeeded his backup role.

Honours
Lazio
UEFA Cup Winners' Cup: 1998–99
UEFA Super Cup: 1999
Serie A: 1999–2000
Coppa Italia: 1999–2000
Supercoppa Italiana: 2000

References

External links
2006-07 La Gazzetta dello Sport Profile 
Profile at Football.it 

Italian footballers
S.S. Lazio players
S.S. Arezzo players
A.C. Perugia Calcio players
Catania S.S.D. players
A.S. Sambenedettese players
A.C. Monza players
A.C. ChievoVerona players
F.C. Crotone players
A.S.G. Nocerina players
Serie A players
Serie B players
Association football goalkeepers
Footballers from Rome
1978 births
Living people